Double or Nothing is the second solo studio album by the American rapper and record producer Erick Sermon. It was released on November 7, 1995, via Rush Associated Labels. The production was mainly handled by Sermon, and several tracks were co-produced by Redman, Rockwilder, Rod 'KP' Kirkpatrick and Ty Fyffe. The album features contributions from Keith Murray, Redman, Jazze Pha, Passion and Roz. Double or Nothing spawned two singles: "Bomdigi" and "Welcome".

The album peaked at #35 on the Billboard 200 and at #6 on the Top R&B/Hip-Hop Albums chart in the United States.

Track listing

Personnel
Erick Sermon – main artist, producer (tracks: 1-2, 4-6, 9-13, 16-17), co-producer (tracks: 3, 7, 8, 14), executive producer
Reginald Noble – featured artist (tracks: 3, 12, 17), producer (tracks: 14, 15)
Keith Omar Murray – featured artist (tracks: 5, 8, 10, 17)
Roslyn "Roz" Noble – featured artist (track 5)
Passion Johnson – featured artist (track 12)
Crystal Gamble – vocals (track 2)
Dana Stinson – vocals (track 7), producer (tracks: 7, 8)
Aaron Hall – vocals (track 8)
Phalon Anton Alexander – vocals (tracks: 9, 15)
Tyrone Fyffe – vocals (track 12), co-producer (tracks: 2, 4, 12)
Rod 'KP' Kirkpatrick – producer (track 3), co-producer (track 5)
Troy Hightower – engineering

Chart history

References

External links
Double Or Nothing on Bandcamp

1995 albums
Erick Sermon albums
Def Jam Recordings albums
Albums produced by Rockwilder
Albums produced by Erick Sermon